The International Ornithological Committee (IOC) recognizes these 387 tanager species in family Thraupidae, which are distributed among 108 genera. One species on the list, the St. Kitts bullfinch, is extinct. Confusingly, only 146 of the species are called "tanager"; another 99 are called "finch". This family is found only in the New World, primarily in South and Middle America and the Caribbean, though a few species are occasionally found in the United States. (The 20 species called tanagers in genera Piranga, Habia, and Chlorothraupis are members of another family, Cardinalidae). This list is presented in IOC taxonomic sequence and is also sortable alphabetically by common name and binomial name.

List

References

T